Mitrudu is a 2009 Indian Telugu-language drama film produced by Sivalenka Krishna Prasad under Vaishavi Cinema banner, directed by Mahadev. Starring Nandamuri Balakrishna, Priyamani  and music composed by Mani Sharma. This film was later dubbed into Hindi as Aaj Ka Hindustani and Bhojpuri as Phool Aur Kaante.

Plot
The film begins with an industrialist Sai Krishna beloved his only daughter Indu who is studying abroad and aspires for a top-tier son-in-law. Once, malice MLA Muni Swamy approaches him to splice Indu with his debauch son when a brawl erupts. Simultaneously, Sai Krishna finds a fine alliance for Indu via advocate Vishwanath and proceeds. In between, enraged Muni Swamy ploys an attempt to kill him which accelerates a disastrous accident but he is safe. After 1 year, Indu lands at India behind the back and reaches Kumbakonam to meet a powerful astrologer as she has a defeat in her horoscope. The soothsayer proclaims the remedy is she should espouse an incredible Zodiac man and the only way to detect him is that is a gallant. 

Now, Indu returns to Malaysia, where Aditya a valor but disparate & despond and waiting to depart from life. Indu is acquainted with him and feels him the same declared in her star sign. Therefrom, she shadows him as white on rice confirms him to her destiny. Parallelly, Indu always aids his physically challenged friend Madhu who upholds a welfare organization for the destitute. Indu proposes to Aditya which he denies but accepts after being perspicacious of her liking, and the two nuptials. Here as a flabbergast, Indu hoodwinked Aditya. The death of her spouse is written within a month in the horoscope, ergo, to abscond it she has made this play. Indeed, she is in love with Madhu unbeknownst that he is an imposter and normal who has been entrapped by her wealth. 

Next, Indu & Madhu silently slips to India but abruptly, Aditya joins them. Surprisingly, he is aware of the entirety still wedlock Indu as he truly loves her, squares up Madhu to shield Indu and expose his deplorable shade. After arrival, they receive disavowal from enraged Sai Krishna, on the verge shot Indu Aditya bars and a strange sense starts in her. Later, Sai Krishna allows them just because of prints on demand by his true-blue & bestie Keshava. Exploiting it, begrudged Muni Swamy derisions at Sai Krishna. Accordingly, Aditya faces the music that he thresholds with patience, and Indu’s endearment also hikes. Anyhow, Aditya confronts Muni Swamy and lets his conceit down. Infuriated Madhu intrigues to slay Aditya when he is impeded by Keshava who turns into a treacherous. He is the mastermind behind the scam and the father of Madhu. Subsequently, the knaves' plot by revolting Aditya on workers as Sai Krishna is keen on them. Plus, Madhu stabs Keshava to exaggerate his fury. Spotting it, Aditya backfires on him which Indu distorts and reacted when Aditya is gravely injured. Currently, he is in critical condition, and Sai Krishna angrily looking forward to his death. Suddenly, Lawyer Viswanath grounds therein, retorts on Sai Krishna affirms Aditya is the same whom he yearned to make as his son-in-law and spins back. 

Raghavendra Bapineedu the grandfather of Aditya a top-tier of the region. On the eve of his 80th birthday, his conjoined extended family arrives from abroad and they spend a jollity time. During their return, a hazardous blast happens in the house, because of the misfortune of Sai Krishna’s accident. Today, Aditya is left alone protected by an omnipotent bracelet bestowed by his grandfather that's why he doesn’t have any interest in life. Listening to it, Sai Krishna regrets, and Indu’s faithful adoration flourishes on Aditya. All at once, Aditya disappears when Viswanath says that it's exactly 1 year of his family died. Hence, he has gone to their village to conduct their ceremony. Aditya holds the pain, closes the event, and collapses at his ruined house to leave his breath. Besides, the soothsayer questioned whether the horoscope becomes real. Then, he proclaims that he has knitted the two as they are footing each other. At this juncture, Indu’s willpower is his strength to survive. Concurrently, Indu gets to Aditya, and Madhu also comes into the scene colluding with Muni Swamy where she learns his true shade. Thus, Indu comprehends the put right of their plight is her lying dying. In this light, she attempts suicide. At last, Aditya wakes up, ceases the baddies, and secures Indu. Finally, the movie ends on a happy note with the uniting of Aditya & Indu.

Cast 

 Nandamuri Balakrishna as Aditya
 Priyamani as Indu
 Deepak as Madhu
 Brahmanandam as JB Jan / Jana Bethedu Janardhan
 M. Balayya as Aditya's grandfather
 Pradeep Rawat 
 Chandra Mohan
 Ahuti Prasad
 Chalapathi Rao
 Krishna Bhagawan
 Raghu Babu
 Srinivasa Reddy
 Surekha Vani
 Hema
 Dharmavarapu Subramanyam
 Rallapalli
 Ranganath
 Srilalitha as Takhali
 Kuchuri Rachana Moiurya
 Sandhya Jalak
 Giridhar
 Rama Chandra
 Vasu Inturi
 Sana
 Pragathi
 Rajitha
 Baby Annie as Adhitya's sister-in-law

Soundtrack 

Music composed by Mani Sharma. Music released on Lahari Music Company.

Release 
The film met with negative reviews from critics.

References

External links 
 

2009 films
2000s Telugu-language films
Films scored by Mani Sharma